The Arafura Games is a multi-sport event where athletes with a disability compete in the same program as able-bodied athletes. Competitors from around the world compete in the week-long games held every 2 years in Darwin, Northern Territory, Australia.

Called a "meeting of Sporting Neighbours", the Arafura Games takes its name from the Arafura Sea, which lies between northern Australia and Southeast Asia. Nations along the Arafura Sea originally formed the basis of the Arafura Games, however in recent years countries from further afield have participated, including United States, England, Brazil and Liechtenstein.

History
First held in 1991. A foundation sport of the Arafura Games, Basketball has grown from a 4 team competition with teams from around the Darwin region to an 8 team international competition with teams from all over the world. The Games were known as the Arafura Sports Festival up until 1997. These Games were the first ever international sporting festival to have Australian Rules Football as an international competition sport in its own right.  The International Australian Football Council was formed after the 1995 Games, playing an important role in promoting Aussie Rules until dissolving in 2001.

The Arafura Games were cancelled in 2003 due to concern over the SARS virus. From 2005 onwards, the Arafura Games included events for athletes with physical disabilities. The 2007 Arafura Games received patronage from the International Paralympic Committee (IPC).

In 2011, the Arafura Games incorporated the Oceania Paralympic Championships for the sports of athletics,
swimming, powerlifting, and table tennis.

The 2013 Arafura Games was cancelled by the newly elected CLP government on 31 October 2012 as it "costs too much to run".

After an eight-year hiatus, the 2019 Arafura Games were held from 27 April to 4 May 2019.

Basketball
Conducted under Federation of International Basketball Associations (FIBA) conditions and Guidelines, Basketball is played at the Darwin Basketball Stadium, Abala Road Marrara, in the Marrara Sporting Complex.

In recent years, USA squad players from university teams dominated the competition. The Northern Territory team have been shaded in the last 4 Arafura Games by the Americans and only their depth on the bench has let them down. The Northern Territory have won the Silver medal in the past 4 Arafura games. 2007 Arafura Games Basketball results:

Gold 	United States of America: USA Colleges

Silver 	Northern Territory: Northern Territory

Bronze 	Australian Indigenous: Australian Indigenous

Sports

Athletics – including Paralympic athletics and Olympic events
Badminton (2007, 2009, 2019, 2023)
Basketball
Boxing
Cricket – Twenty20 format
Field hockey
Football (soccer) – including Paralympic football events
Golf
International lifesaving
Muay Thai
Sepak takraw
Shooting – Clay Target
Shooting – Pistol (IPSC)
Shooting – Pistol/Air Rifle (ISSF)
Squash
Swimming – including Paralympic swimming events
Table tennis – including Paralympic table tennis events
Ten-pin bowling
Triathlon
Volleyball
Weightlifting – including Paralympic powerlifting events
Water polo

Other sports played at the Arafura Games:
 Netball

Participating countries

East Asia
 
 
 
 
 
 
South Asia
 
 
 
 
 
Central Asia
 
 
 
 
 
SouthEast Asia
 
 
 
 
 
 
 
 
 

Oceania/ Pacific
 
 
 
 
 
 
 
 
 
 
 
AUS States/ territories
 
 
 
 
 
 
 
 
AUS Other
Australian Defence Force
  Indigenous Australians

The Americas
 
 
 
 
 
 
 
 
 

The Persian Gulf
 
 
 
 
 
 
 
 

Europe
 
 
 
 
  
 
 
 
 
 
 
 
 
 
 
Africa

References

 Archive of results - 2007, 2009 & 2011

External links
Official website

 
1991 establishments in Australia
Recurring sporting events established in 1991
Disabled multi-sport events
Multi-sport events in Australia
Sports festivals in Australia
Sports competitions in the Northern Territory
Sport in Darwin, Northern Territory